Matt Hetherington (born 25 May 1970) is an Australian singer and actor, who rose to prominence as a contestant on the first series of The Voice (Australia). He has appeared in musicals Next to Normal, Green Room Award, Dirty Rotten Scoundrels Green Room Award and Sydney Theatre Award and The Full Monty, the latter for which he won the Helpmann Award for Best Male Actor in a Musical.

Credits

Television
Dr Blake Mysteries
City Homicide
Marshall Law
Stingers 
The Voice (Australia)

Stage
Dirty Rotten Scoundrels (2009)
Flowerchildren (2011)
The Full Monty (2004)
Hair (2003)
Happy Days - The Arena Spectacular
Next to Normal (2011)
Shane Warne: The Musical (2008)
Sweet Charity (2003)
Promises, Promises (2012)
Gypsy (2013)
North by Northwest (2015)

References

External links
Matt Hetherington at The Voice

1971 births
Living people
Australian male stage actors
Helpmann Award winners